Malo Trebeljevo is a small settlement in the hills east of Ljubljana, the capital of Slovenia. It belongs to the City Municipality of Ljubljana. It is part of the traditional region of Lower Carniola and is now included with the rest of the municipality in the Central Slovenia Statistical Region.

South of the settlement, by Besnica Creek, a Roman-period burial ground has been discovered. It is likely associated with a nearby villa rustica.

References

External links
Malo Trebeljevo on Geopedia

Populated places in the City Municipality of Ljubljana
Sostro District